Lazar Milošev (born 20 June 1996) is a Serbian footballer who plays as a forward for Železničar Pančevo.

Club career

Early years
Born in Pančevo, Milošev started playing football with local club Dinamo. Later, he was also with OFK Beograd youth academy. He made his first senior appearances with Dinamo Pančevo in the 2014–15 season of the Serbian League Vojvodina, where he appeared as a loaned player. In summer 2014, Dinamo also formed a satellite club Dinamo 1945, which became the successor from the 2015–16 season. Milošev continued playing with the club in the fifth level league PFL Pančevo, promoting himself as a second team scorer with 11 goals on 14 matches in the first half-season. Later he moved to Borac Sakule, where he spent the whole 2016, and was a scorer 12 times on 27 matches in the Serbian League Vojvodina. Milošev also received a call into the amateur squad under Football Association of Vojvodina for the UEFA Regions' Cup in 2016, after he played in final of the Vojvodina regional cup.

Rad
At the beginning of 2017, Milošev joined Serbian SuperLiga side Rad, signing a three-and-a-half year professional contract with new club. He made his professional debut for Rad in 22 fixture match of the 2016–17 Serbian SuperLiga season against Partizan, played on 19 February 2017. He also scored his first goal for the club in 3–2 defeat against Vojvodina in the next fixture match. Playing with Rad, Milošev collected 12 matches and scored 3 goals at total until the end of season. He also started new season under Gordan Petrić, and continued playing under manager Slađan Nikolić, making 16 caps with 2 goals in the first half of the 2017–18 Serbian SuperLiga campaign. Through the spring half-season, Milošev made a single appearances under coach Zoran Milinković, replacing Bogdan Mladenović in 2–0 victory over OFK Bačka on 29 April 2018. Following the end of season, Milošev mutually terminated a contract with the club and left Rad as a free agent in May 2018.

Budućnost Dobanovci
In August 2018, Milošev joined the Serbian First League side Budućnost Dobanovci as a free player. He made his debut in the opening match of the 2018–19 Serbian First League campaign, against Bečej on 12 August 2018. In the second fixture match, played on 20 August same year, Milošev scored both goals in 2–0 away victory over Trayal. Milošev also scored in the next fixture, for 1–1 draw with Teleoptik.

Tabor Sežana
In June 2019, Milošev signed for newly promoted Slovenian PrvaLiga side Tabor Sežana.

Career statistics

References

External links
 
 
 
 

1996 births
Living people
Sportspeople from Pančevo
Association football forwards
Serbian footballers
OFK Beograd players
FK Dinamo Pančevo players
FK Rad players
FK Budućnost Dobanovci players
NK Tabor Sežana players
FK Napredak Kruševac players
FK Železničar Pančevo players
Serbian First League players
Serbian SuperLiga players
Slovenian PrvaLiga players
Serbian expatriate footballers
Serbian expatriate sportspeople in Slovenia
Expatriate footballers in Slovenia